Brand New Morning  may refer to:
 Brand New Morning (Bob Seger album), 1971
 Brand New Morning (Magnum album), 2004
 "Brand New Morning / Jealousy Jealousy", a 2017 single by Japanese group Morning Musume